Uttarakhand Pradesh Congress Committee or Uttarakhand PCC is the state wing of the Indian National Congress (INC) in Uttarakhand.

Leadership

List of Presidents

List of Chief Ministers

List of CLP Leaders

Electoral performance

Legislative Assembly elections

Lok Sabha elections

See also
 Indian National Congress
 Congress Working Committee
 All India Congress Committee
 Pradesh Congress Committee
 Bharatiya Janata Party, Uttarakhand
 Uttarakhand Kranti Dal

References

External links
 Uttarakhand Pradesh Congress Committee official website

Indian National Congress
Indian National Congress of Uttarakhand
Political parties in Uttarakhand